Manuel Cabagay Melchor (born March 14, 1969) is a Filipino former professional boxer who competed from 1987 to 2002. He held the IBF mini flyweight title in 1992.

Professional career

Melchor turned professional in 1987 and compiled a record of 19–15–4 before facing and defeating Fahlan Sakkreerin, to win the IBF Mini flyweight title. He would lose the title in his first defense against Ratanapol Sor Vorapin. Melchor would get stopped by WBC champ & Mexican legend Ricardo López in his second attempt at a world title He would face another Mexican boxer José Antonio Aguirre, in his final attempt at a world title in 2001, he would lose via unanimous decision.

Professional boxing record

Boxing trainer
Melchor retired in 2002 and went on to become a boxing trainer.

See also
List of world mini-flyweight boxing champions
List of Filipino boxing world champions

References

External links

 

1969 births
Living people
Filipino male boxers
Sportspeople from Oriental Mindoro
International Boxing Federation champions
World mini-flyweight boxing champions
Boxing trainers
Mini-flyweight boxers